Psilocybe columbiana is a species of mushroom in the family Hymenogastraceae known only from the páramos of high mountains in Colombia. It is in the Psilocybe fagicola complex with Psilocybe fagicola, Psilocybe oaxacana, Psilocybe banderillensis, Psilocybe herrerae, Psilocybe keralensis, Psilocybe neoxalapensis, and Psilocybe teofiloi.

See also
List of Psilocybin mushrooms
Psilocybin mushrooms
Psilocybe

References

columbiana
Fungi of Colombia
Altiplano Cundiboyacense
Páramo fungi
Entheogens
Psychoactive fungi
Psychedelic tryptamine carriers
Fungi described in 1978
Taxa named by Gastón Guzmán